Dolores Airport is a public use airport located near Dolores, Buenos Aires, Argentina.

See also
List of airports in Argentina

References

External links 
 Airport record for Dolores Airport at Landings.com

Airports in Argentina
Buenos Aires Province